Robert Laurence Wawak (September 4, 1939 – April 17, 2004) was an American NASCAR driver from Villa Park, Illinois. He made 141 Grand National/Winston Cup Series starts, with fourteen top-10 finishes.

Racing career

Local racing
He began drag racing as a teenager. He raced in his first stock car race at around 1958 at Mance Park Speedway in Hodgkins, Illinois. He raced regularly at the O'Hare Stadium in Schiller Park, Illinois. He competed in both the cadet (sportsman) and late model divisions.

In 1974 he was the late model stock car champion at Illiana Motor Speedway in Schererville, Indiana. He competed at the track in 1973 and 1974, winning 14 features at that half mile asphalt track in his 1971 Ford Torino. He won 21 total races (including preliminary events) in 1974.

National touring series

USAC
Wawak competed on the USAC stock car circuit in 1965. He made six races with a sixth-place finish in one event during his rookie season. He finished 18th in the final USAC standings that year.  Wawak did not return to USAC racing until 1969 and would compete on a limited basis into the early 1970s.

NASCAR
Wawak made occasional NASCAR starts before 1976, except for making 14 NASCAR starts in 1967. His first start was in the 1965 Southern 500 at Darlington Speedway. He started 27th, and finished 36th with engine problems.

His most successful year was 1976, when he finished 22nd in the points. His highest career finish was a sixth-place finish in the final race of the season at Ontario.

The fuel line on his car came loose on the third lap of the 1977 Daytona 500, and the fire came into the car's cockpit. Wawak jumped from the car while it was still moving (and slammed into the inside wall moments later), held up his burnt hands, and ran to the infield care center. "It was like sitting in front of a blow torch," Wawak said later. He made six more starts that year.

He continued racing in NASCAR, and made 96 more NASCAR starts. His career ended when he crashed in the first qualifier for the 1988 Daytona 500, Wawak suffering a fractured vertebra and detached retinas. Randy LaJoie raced in one race in his car in 1988, and Mike Potter raced three races in 1990.

After his NASCAR career ended, he helped Hendrick Motorsports with their show cars.

In media
He appeared in NASCAR Thunder 2004 as an unlockable driver in a car numbered 36.

Death
At age 64, Wawak died on April 17, 2004. He was survived by his wife Stevi, daughters, Jaclin Wawak and Robin Wawak Pemberton and grandchildren, Lauri Trotter and River Pemberton, in addition to two brothers, Allen Wawak and Richard Wawak; three sisters, Carole Tarvash, Joyce Annanie, and Marilyn Zmich.

Motorsports career results

NASCAR
(key) (Bold – Pole position awarded by qualifying time. Italics – Pole position earned by points standings or practice time. * – Most laps led.)

Grand National Series

Winston Cup Series

Daytona 500

ARCA Permatex SuperCar Series
(key) (Bold – Pole position awarded by qualifying time. Italics – Pole position earned by points standings or practice time. * – Most laps led.)

References

1939 births
2004 deaths
American Speed Association drivers
NASCAR drivers
People from Villa Park, Illinois
Racing drivers from Chicago
Racing drivers from Illinois